The Church History (or Historia Ecclesiae) of Eusebius, the bishop of Caesarea was a 4th-century pioneer work giving a chronological account of the development of Early Christianity from the 1st century to the 4th century. It was written in Koine Greek, and survives also in Latin, Syriac and Armenian manuscripts.

Church history

The result was the first full-length historical narrative written from a Christian point of view. In the early 5th century, two advocates in Constantinople, Socrates Scholasticus and Sozomen, and a bishop, Theodoret of Cyrrhus, Syria, wrote continuations of Eusebius' church history, establishing the convention of continuators that would determine to a great extent the way history was written for the next thousand years. Eusebius' Chronicle, which attempted to lay out a comparative timeline of pagan and Old Testament history, set the model for the other historiographical genre, the medieval chronicle or universal history.

Eusebius had access to the Theological Library of Caesarea and made use of many ecclesiastical monuments and documents, acts of the martyrs, letters, extracts from earlier Christian writings, lists of bishops, and similar sources, often quoting the originals at great length so that his work contains materials not elsewhere preserved. For example, he wrote that Matthew composed the Gospel according to the Hebrews and his Church Catalogue suggests that it was the only Jewish gospel.

It is therefore of historical value, though it pretends neither to completeness nor to the observance of due proportion in the treatment of the subject-matter.  Nor does it present in a connected and systematic way the history of the early Christian Church. It is to no small extent a vindication of the Christian religion, though the author did not primarily intend it as such. Eusebius has been often accused of intentional falsification of the truth. Other scholars, while admitting that his judging of persons or facts is not entirely unbiased, push back on claims of intentional fabrication as "quite unjust."

Plan of the work

Eusebius attempted according to his own declaration (I.i.1) to present the history of the Church from the apostles to his own time, with special regard to the following points:

the successions of bishops in the principal sees;
the history of Christian teachers;
the history of heresies;
the history of the Jews;
the relations to the heathen;
the martyrdoms.

He grouped his material according to the reigns of the emperors, presenting it as he found it in his sources.  The contents are as follows:

 Book I: detailed introduction on Jesus Christ
 Book II: The history of the apostolic time to the destruction of Jerusalem by Titus
 Book III: The following time to Trajan
 Books IV and V: approximately the 2nd century
 Book VI:  The time from Septimius Severus to Decius
 Book VII: extends to the outbreak of the persecution under Diocletian
 Book VIII:  more of this persecution
 Book IX:  history to Constantine's victory over Maxentius in the West and over Maximinus in the East
 Book X: The reestablishment of the churches and the rebellion and conquest of Licinius.

Chronology

In its present form, the work was brought to a conclusion before the death of Crispus (July 326), and, since book x is dedicated to Paulinus, Archbishop of Tyre, who died before 325, at the end of 323 or in 324. This work required the most comprehensive preparatory studies, and it must have occupied him for years. His collection of martyrdoms of the older period may have been one of these preparatory studies.

Attitudes of the author
Eusebius blames the calamities which befell the Jewish nation on the Jews' role in the death of Jesus.  This quote has been used to attack both Jews and Christians (see Antisemitism in Christianity).

This is not simply antisemitism, however.  Eusebius levels a similar charge against Christians, blaming a spirit of divisiveness for some of the most severe persecutions.

He also launches into a panegyric in the middle of Book x. He praises the Lord for his provisions and kindness to them for allowing them to rebuild their churches after they have been destroyed.

Criticism

The accuracy of Eusebius' account has often been called into question. In the 5th century, the Christian historian Socrates Scholasticus described Eusebius as writing for “rhetorical finish” in his Vita Constantini and for the “praises of the Emperor” rather than the “accurate statement of facts.” The methods of Eusebius were criticised by Edward Gibbon in the 18th century. In the 19th century Jacob Burckhardt viewed Eusebius as 'a liar', the “first thoroughly dishonest historian of antiquity.”  Ramsay MacMullen in the 20th century regarded Eusebius' work as representative of early Christian historical accounts in which “Hostile writings and discarded views were not recopied or passed on, or they were actively suppressed... matters discreditable to the faith were to be consigned to silence.” As a consequence this kind of methodology in MacMullen's view has distorted modern attempts, (e.g. Harnack, Nock, and Brady), to describe how the Church  grew in the early centuries.  Arnaldo Momigliano wrote that in Eusebius' mind "chronology was something between an exact science and an instrument of propaganda "

Translations 
The work was translated into other languages in ancient time (Latin, Syriac, Armenian). Codex Syriac 1 housed at the National Library of Russia is one of the oldest Syriac manuscripts, dated to the year 462. The first English translation was by Mary Basset, the granddaughter of Sir Thomas More, made between 1544 and 1553; the first version to be printed was by Meredith Hanmer, in 1576.

English translations 

Eusebius, Christian Frederic Crusé, and Henry de Valois. The Ecclesiastical History of Eusebius Pamphilus. London: G. Bell and Sons, 1897.

Eusebius, and Roy Joseph Deferrari. Eusebius Pamphili Ecclesiastical History. Washington, D.C.: The Catholic University of America Press, 1969.

Eusebius, Arthur Cushman McGiffert, and Earnest Cushing Richardson. Eusebius. New York: The Christian Literature Co, 1890.

Kirsopp Lake (†), J. E. L. Oulton, Hugh Jackson Lawlor. Eusebius: The Ecclesiastical History, in Two Volumes. London: W. Heinemann, 1926–1942.

Louth, A., and G. A. Williamson. Eusebius: The History of the Church from Christ to Constantine. London: Penguin, 1965.

Maier, Paul L., ed. Eusebius: The Church History; A New Translation with Commentary. Grand Rapids: Kregel, 1999.

See also

 Ecclesiastical history (Catholicism)
 Medieval ecclesiastic historiography

Other early church historians:

Socrates Scholasticus
Sozomen
Theodoret of Cyrus
Rufinus of Aquileia (he added two books to his translation of Eusebius)
Philostorgius
Evagrius Scholasticus
Zacharias Rhetor
Theodorus Lector
John of Ephesus
Bede, Historia ecclesiastica gentis Anglorum
Flavius Josephus
Saint Hegisuppus
Justin Irenaeus

References

Sources

Further reading
 R. M. Q. Grant, Eusebius as Church Historian (Oxford University Press) 1980. Discusses the dependability of Eusebius as a historian.
 Doron Mendels, The Media Revolution of Early Christianity : An Essay on Eusebius's Ecclesiastical History ( Wm. B. Eerdmans Publishing Co.) 1999

External links
Greek text 
Abbreviated English text, McGiffert translation
English text, McGiffert translation, with introduction and notes
 

4th-century Christian texts
4th-century history books
Patristic historical writings
Works by Eusebius of Caesarea
History of Christianity texts